Choengchai Chomchoengpaet is a Thai naval officer.  he serves as commander-in-chief of the Royal Thai Navy. He previously served as assistant navy commander.

References 

Living people
Year of birth missing (living people)
Place of birth missing (living people)
Choengchai Chomchoengpaet
Choengchai Chomchoengpaet